Almost Here may refer to:

Almost Here (The Academy Is... album), 2005
"Almost Here" (The Academy Is... song)
Almost Here (Unbelievable Truth album)
"Almost Here" (Brian McFadden and Delta Goodrem song), 2005